Bunmi Adaeze Mojekwu  is an English actress, known for portraying the role of Mercy Olubunmi in the BBC soap opera EastEnders.

Early life
Mojekwu was born in Brixton, South London, to Nigerian parents. She is the eldest of four children. In 2006, her family moved to Kent.

Acting career
Mojekwu began acting at school with a small role in The Wizard of Oz. She joined Identity Drama School in Kent in 2006 and won the school's Actress of the Year award in her first year. Mojekwu went on to play Paris in Bola Agbaje's award-winning play Gone Too Far!. In 2008, she starred as Ronnie in Channel 4's Fallout and in 2009 she got the part of Mercy Olubunmi in the Internet teen drama EastEnders: E20, a spin-off from the long-running BBC One soap opera EastEnders, which was broadcast in January 2010. Following this, she was contracted for six months to appear in East Enders as Mercy Olubunmi. She left East Enders on-screen on 12 July 2011.

Filmography

References

External links
 
 

English television actresses
British soap opera actresses
English stage actresses
English people of Nigerian descent
Black British actresses
People from Brixton
Actresses from London
Living people
Year of birth missing (living people)